Courts of Wisconsin include:
;State courts of Wisconsin
Wisconsin Supreme Court
Wisconsin Court of Appeals (4 districts)
Wisconsin Circuit Court (9 judicial administrative districts (1-5 and 7-10))
Wisconsin Municipal Courts

Federal courts located in Wisconsin
United States District Court for the Eastern District of Wisconsin
United States District Court for the Western District of Wisconsin

Former federal courts of Wisconsin
United States District Court for the District of Wisconsin (extinct, subdivided)

See also
 List of Wisconsin circuit court judges

References

External links
National Center for State Courts - directory of state court websites.

 

Courts in the United States
Wisconsin state courts